The 2011–12 season of Division 1, the third tier of ice hockey in Sweden, began on 14 September 2011 and ended on 19 February 2012, with promotion and relegation tournaments continuing until 6 April. 56 teams participated in the league (Luleå Rebels HC had gone bankrupt in October 2011), divided into six geographical groups lettered A through F.

Format
The first half of the regular season started with six groups, with eight teams in groups A and B, and ten teams in the other groups.  The teams played three or four matches against the other teams in their group, resulting in a first half of 21, 27 or 28 matches.

After new years, the teams were regrouped according to their first-half performance. The top four teams from each group formed three new groups, called Allettan Norra ("North", from groups A and B), Allettan Mellan ("Central", from groups C and D) and Allettan Södra ("South", from groups E and F).  The teams that didn't qualify for Allettan played a continuation series with the remaining teams in their original groups.

At the conclusion of the regular season in February, the lowest-ranked teams from the continuation groups were forced to play qualifiers against the best Division 2 teams to retain their spots in Division 1 for the following season.  Meanwhile, the top teams from each of the continuation groups, along with the top four teams from each of the Allettan groups, qualified for a playoff.  The four surviving teams at the end of the playoffs participated in the 2012 HockeyAllsvenskan in order to compete for promotion to Sweden's second-tier league HockeyAllsvenskan against that league's two teams with the worst records in 2011–12.

Participating clubs

 Luleå Rebels HC went bankrupt in mid-October 2011 and ceased to exist. As a result, all games the team had played this season were nullified and removed from the Division 1A standings.

First half

Division 1A

Division 1B

Division 1C

Division 1D

Division 1E

Division 1F

Second half

Allettan Norra

Allettan Mellan

Allettan Södra

Division 1A continuation

Division 1B continuation

Division 1C continuation

Division 1D continuation

Division 1E continuation

Division 1F continuation

Playoffs

Round 1
IF Björklöven vs Bodens HF (2–0)

Östersunds IK vs Ånge IK (2–1)

Åker/Strängnäs HC vs Enköpings SK HK (1–2)

Hudiksvalls HC vs Huddinge IK (1–2)

Kallinge-Ronneby IF vs Tranås AIF (2–0)

Olofströms IK vs Nybro Vikings IF (2–0)

Round 2
IF Björklöven vs Olofströms IK (1–2)

Kallinge-Ronneby IF vs Enköpings SK HK (2–0)

Asplöven HC vs Huddinge IK (2–1)

Karlskrona HK vs Östersunds IK (2–1)

Round 3

Kiruna IF vs Asplöven HC (1–2)

Nyköpings HK vs Kallinge-Ronneby IF (1–2)

HC Vita Hästen vs Karlskrona HK (1–2)

Wings HC Arlanda vs Olofströms IK (0–2)

2012 HockeyAllsvenskan qualifier

*Borås HC initially qualified for HockeyAllsvenskan, but was relegated to Division 1 due to no elite license. They were replaced by the third-placed team Asplöven HC for the following season.

2012 Division 1 qualifiers

Group A

Group B

Group C

Group D

Group E

Group F

References

3
Swedish Division I seasons